The chestnut-and-black weaver (Ploceus castaneofuscus) is a species of bird in the family Ploceidae. It  is found in West Africa from Sierra Leone to southern Nigeria.

The chestnut-and-black weaver was formerly treated as a subspecies of Vieillot's black weaver (Ploceus nigerrimus). The species were split based on the striking differences in the colour of the plumage.

Gallery

References

chestnut-and-black weaver
chestnut-and-black weaverr